Young Nowheres is a 1929 American drama film directed by Frank Lloyd and starring Richard Barthelmess, Marian Nixon and Bert Roach. It was produced and released by First National Pictures with Vitaphone soundtrack. It was released in silent and sound versions.

Cast
 Richard Barthelmess as Albert 'Binky' Whalen  
 Marian Nixon as Annie Jackson  
 Bert Roach as Mr. Jesse  
 Anders Randolf as Cleaver  
 Ray Turner as George  
 Jocelyn Lee as Brunette
 Scott Seaton as Judge

Preservation status
The film's status is listed as unknown suggesting it may be lost.

References

Bibliography
 Hans J. Wollstein. Strangers in Hollywood: the history of Scandinavian actors in American films from 1910 to World War II. Scarecrow Press, 1994.

External links

1929 films
1929 drama films
American drama films
Films directed by Frank Lloyd
1920s English-language films
First National Pictures films
American black-and-white films
Films based on works by I. A. R. Wylie
1920s American films